The 33rd Croatia Division (Serbo-Croatian Latin: Tridesettreća hrvatska divizija) was a Yugoslav Partisan division formed on 19 January 1944 in Koprivnica. It was formed from the 1st and 2nd Moslavina Brigades which had a total of 1,165 fighters. The division was a part of the 9th Corps and it operated in Zagorje, Kalnik and Moslavina regions.

References 

Divisions of the Yugoslav Partisans
Military units and formations established in 1944